Gary Winston Boyle (born 24 November 1941) is a British jazz fusion guitarist.

Biography
Boyle was born in Patna, Bihar, India, on 24 November 1941. He attended the Leeds College of Music in the early 1960s and then joined the folk-rock band Eclection. He also played in The Echoes, Dusty Springfield's band in the mid-1960s, and recorded with Brian Auger and Julie Driscoll. In the early 1970s he worked as a session musician with musicians Keith Tippett, Mike Gibbs, Mike Westbrook, Stomu Yamashta, Bert Jansch and Norma Winstone.

In 1973, Boyle founded the jazz fusion band Isotope with Jeff Clyne (bass), Brian Miller (keyboards) and Nigel Morris (drums). This line-up gigged around the United Kingdom extensively.

Discography
With Isotope
 Isotope - 1974
 Illusion - 1974 (re-issued in 2011 by Cherry Red Records, Esoteric Recordings Label)
 Deep End - 1976
 Isotope & Gary Boyle: Live at the BBC - 2004
 Golden Section - 2008

Under his name
 The Dancer (Montreux Jazz/Pop Award) - 1978
 Electric Glide - 1978
 Step Out - 1981
 Friday Night Again - 1986
 Triple Echo - 1994
 Games - 2003

Other Projects
"Sketch" with Maggie Boyle and Dave Bowie CD 2007

References

External links

1941 births
Jazz fusion guitarists
British rock guitarists
British male guitarists
Musicians from Bihar
Living people
Alumni of Leeds College of Music
Isotope (band) members
Brian Auger and the Trinity members
British male jazz musicians